Rodolfo Córdoba Correa (born January 14, 1984) is a Colombian footballer who last played for Estudiantes de Mérida of Venezuela.

External links
 

1984 births
Living people
Colombian footballers
América de Cali footballers
Deportes Quindío footballers
Centauros Villavicencio footballers
Unión Deportivo Universitario players
C.D. FAS footballers
Estudiantes de Mérida players
Colombian expatriate footballers
Expatriate footballers in Panama
Expatriate footballers in El Salvador
Expatriate footballers in Venezuela
Association football midfielders
Footballers from Cali